Blinkovsky is a rural locality (a khutor) in Popovskoye Rural Settlement, Kumylzhensky District, Volgograd Oblast, Russia. The population was 37 as of 2010.

Geography 
Blinkovsky is located in forest steppe, on Khopyorsko-Buzulukskaya Plain, on the bank of the Yedovlya River, 51 km northwest of Kumylzhenskaya (the district's administrative centre) by road. Olkhovsky is the nearest rural locality.

References 

Rural localities in Kumylzhensky District